The Mommy Returns is a 2012 Filipino family comedy-horror movie produced by Regal Films. It was released in Philippine cinemas on May 9, 2012. The title is a direct reference to 2001’s The Mummy Returns.

Plot 
The Mommy Returns tells the story of a mother, Ruby (Pokwang), who dies right on the day of her 25th wedding anniversary with husband, William (Gabby Concepcion). With her untimely death, she leaves behind her three children Amethyst (Kiray Celis), Topaz (Gerald Pesigan), and Sapphire (Jillian Ward).

Ruby is also temporarily trapped in PURGA (short for Purgatory) with its guardian, Dyoga (John Lapus) and the pesky Manny, the chicken pet of San Pedro.

When Catherine (Ruffa Gutierrez), a younger and prettier woman comes into the life of William, Ruby escapes from PURGA and returns to earth as a ghost to drive Catherine out of the family she left behind.

Cast
 Pokwang as Ruby Pascual-Martirez
 Gabby Concepcion as William Martirez
 Ruffa Gutierrez as Catherine Laurel-Martirez
 Kiray Celis as Amethyst "Amy" P. Martirez
 Gerald Pesigan as Topaz "Toffi" P. Martirez
 Jillian Ward as Sapphire "Saf" P. Martirez
 Gloria Diaz as Mabel Diaz-Laurel
 John Lapus as Diyoga
 Moi Bien as Inday Moi
 Kerbie Zamora as Gary
 Ervic Vijandre as Rodel
 Hiro Magalona as Emil

Release

Distribution
The Mommy Returns had a premiere night in Cinema 9 of SM Megamall on May 8, 2012. It was released in Philippine cinemas on May 11, 2012.

Box office
The Mother's Story grossed P30.6 million in the Philippines after two weeks of release, according to figures from Box Office Mojo.<ref>[https://boxofficemojo.com/movies/intl/?id=_fTHEMOMMYRETURNS01&country=PH&wk=2012W21&id=_fTHEMOMMYRETURNS01&p=.htm The Mommy Returns" gross] via Box Office Mojo</ref>

Critical receptionThe Mommy Returns received generally negative reviews from local film critics. Mark Angelo Ching of PEP.ph said the comedy film is not funny, and only works in its dramatic moments. He also commented on the dull performance of the cast.

Johanna Poblete of Business World said The Mommy Returns did not offer anything new, and did not "elevate the local movie industry". Philbert Dy of ClickTheCity.com said the movie is "a dreadful bore."

See alsoList of ghost films''

References

External links
 

2012 films
Philippine comedy horror films
2010s Tagalog-language films
2010s comedy horror films
Regal Entertainment films
Fiction about purgatory
2012 comedy films
Films directed by Joel Lamangan
2010s English-language films